Robert Albert John "Sailor" Brown (7 November 1915 – 27 December 2008), also known as Albert Brown or Bert Brown, was an English professional footballer who played as an inside forward. He was given the nickname "Sailor" by teammates due to his "rolling gait and muscularly stocky build".

Career
Brown was born on 7 November 1915 in Great Yarmouth, Norfolk and was educated at St Peter's and Priory School. He played for Great Yarmouth Town and Gorleston as a youth, before making a move to the Football League with Charlton Athletic in August 1934. His debut came against Birmingham City on 29 January 1938 and made 60 appearances and scored 24 goals in all competitions before leaving in January 1940 because of the Second World War. During the war, he served as a sergeant in the Royal Air Force and was a member of the Greenwich auxiliary police. He played for Newcastle United, West Ham United, Millwall, York City, Leicester City, Manchester City, Wolverhampton Wanderers and East Fife as a wartime player,. Brown also featured in six wartime and/or Victory internationals for England, scoring four goals.

Following the war, Brown played for Charlton in the FA Cup Final on 27 April 1946, which was lost 4–1 to Derby County at Wembley Stadium. He joined Nottingham Forest for a fee of £6,750 in May 1946. He made 45 appearances and scored 17 goals for Forest before moving to Aston Villa in October 1947 for a fee of £10,000, then the club's record highest fee paid. After making 30 appearances and scoring nine goals, he was appointed as Gorleston player-manager in August 1948. He left the club in May 1956 to retire from football and worked as a bookmaker and a timber merchant, while also scouting for Villa, although he briefly returned as Gorleston manager in 1958 after Joe Jobling left the club. He lived in Forres, Scotland in his later life and died on 27 December 2008, at the age of 93.

References

1915 births
2008 deaths
Military personnel from Norfolk
Sportspeople from Great Yarmouth
Royal Air Force airmen
English footballers
England wartime international footballers
Association football midfielders
Great Yarmouth Town F.C. players
Gorleston F.C. players
Charlton Athletic F.C. players
Nottingham Forest F.C. players
Aston Villa F.C. players
English Football League players
Royal Air Force personnel of World War II
West Ham United F.C. wartime guest players
Millwall F.C. wartime guest players
York City F.C. wartime guest players
Manchester City F.C. wartime guest players
Huddersfield Town A.F.C. wartime guest players
English football managers
Gorleston F.C. managers
FA Cup Final players